This article presents a list of the historical events and publications of Australian literature during 1884.

Events 
 January — the publishing house of Angus and Robertson is created when George Robertson joined David Mackenzie Angus in partnership.

Books 

 Rolf Boldrewood — Plain Living: A Bush Idyll
 Ada Cambridge — A Marriage Ceremony
 Mary Fortune — Dan Lyons' Doom
 Hamilton Mackinnon — The Marcus Clarke Memorial Volume
 Rosa Praed — Zero : A Story of Monte Carlo
 Catherine Helen Spence — An Agnostic's Progress, from the Known to the Unknown

Poetry 

 Francis Adams — Henry and Other Tales
 Marcus Clarke
 "In a Lady's Album"
 "The Eight Hours' Anniversary"
 "The Wail of the Waiter : A Tavern Catch"
 Mary Hannay Foott — "The Australiad : An Epic for Young Australians"
 William Sharp
 "Mid-Noon in January"
 "Morning in the Bush (December)"
 "The Stock-Driver's Ride"
 Douglas Sladen — A Summer Christmas and A Sonnet Upon the S. S. 'Ballaarat' 
 J. Brunton Stephens — "Drought and Doctrine"

Short stories 

 Marcus Clarke
 "The Author Haunted by His Own Creations"
 "Bullocktown : Glenorchy"

Non-fiction 

 Daniel Henry Deniehy — The Life and Speeches of Daniel Henry Deniehy

Births 

A list, ordered by date of birth (and, if the date is either unspecified or repeated, ordered alphabetically by surname) of births in 1884 of Australian literary figures, authors of written works or literature-related individuals follows, including year of death.

 18 March — Bernard Cronin, novelist (died 1968)
 13 October — Jack McLaren, novelist (died 1954)

Deaths 

A list, ordered by date of death (and, if the date is either unspecified or repeated, ordered alphabetically by surname) of deaths in 1884 of Australian literary figures, authors of written works or literature-related individuals follows, including year of birth.

 13 March — Richard Henry Horne, poet (born 1802)

See also 
 1884 in poetry
 List of years in literature
 List of years in Australian literature
1884 in literature
1883 in Australian literature
1884 in Australia
1885 in Australian literature

References

Literature
Australian literature by year
19th-century Australian literature
1884 in literature